Phloeocharis is a genus of beetles belonging to the family Staphylinidae.

The species of this genus are found in Europe and Northern America.

Species:
 Phloeocharis acutangula Fauvel, 1898 
 Phloeocharis agerata Chatzimanolis, Newton & Engel, 2013

References

Staphylinidae
Staphylinidae genera